Juan Calahorro Bares (born 12 May 1988 in Torredonjimeno, Jaén, Andalusia), commonly known as Juanito, is a Spanish footballer who plays as a central defender.

References

External links

1988 births
Living people
People from Torredonjimeno
Sportspeople from the Province of Jaén (Spain)
Spanish footballers
Footballers from Andalusia
Association football defenders
Segunda División players
Segunda División B players
Betis Deportivo Balompié footballers
CD Alcalá players
Real Betis players
Xerez CD footballers
AD Alcorcón footballers
Algeciras CF footballers
Caudal Deportivo footballers
Ontinyent CF players
Ekstraklasa players
Śląsk Wrocław players
Spanish expatriate footballers
Expatriate footballers in Poland
Spanish expatriate sportspeople in Poland